Michael Hubert Hughes (born ) is a convicted American serial killer on death row in San Quentin. Hughes was initially sentenced to life without parole for the murders of four women and girls in California. Later, he was convicted of committing three further murders of women, linked to the crimes via DNA profiling. At the second trial, he was sentenced to the death penalty.

Biography
Michael Herbert Hughes was born in 1958 in Michigan. Shortly after his birth, his father left the family, and when he was aged 5, his mother moved with her children (he has a sister) to California. He grew up in Pasadena then Los Angeles, where he attended Los Angeles High School from 9th to 12th grade.

Hughes lived in a quite dysfunctional family, as his mother was an alcoholic who regularly beat him and his sister. At one time, Hughes' sister became pregnant. His mother aborted the baby in front of him. During his teen years, he had to be hospitalized multiple times for nervous breakdowns. In 1976, at age 17, he enlisted in the Navy, where he worked as a shipmate for a few months, then worked up to be a gunner's mate.

The areas Hughes stayed while traveling with the Navy include Michigan, San Diego, Long Beach, and  Frostburg, Maryland. After he left the Navy he moved back to California, where he mostly lived on the streets. He made money by selling drugs, during which he met a couple of groups where he made some friends. He and the groups moved through Oakland, to Long Beach, then finally settled in Los Angeles, where Hughes' first confirmed murder happened shortly after.

First trial
In December 1993, Michael Hughes, now a security guard, was arrested in Culver City. In 1998, he was convicted and given a life sentence without parole for the strangulation murders of Teresa Ballard, Brenda Bradley, Terri Myles and Jamie Harrington.

Ballard, 26, was found in Los Angeles' Jesse Owens County Park on September 23, 1992. The other victims were found dumped in alleys in a Culver City commercial area: 38-year-old Bradley; Myles, 33, found on November 8, 1993; and Harrington, 29, found on November 14, 1993.

Second trial
On July 3, 2008, Hughes was charged with sexually assaulting and strangling two women and two teenage girls in the Los Angeles area between 1986 and 1993, after homicide detectives linked him to DNA samples from the victims using new forensic technologies. The case of Deanna Wilson, 30, who was found in a garage on August 30, 1990, was later dropped but was used by prosecutors to establish Hughes' pattern.

Hughes killed 15-year-old Yvonne Coleman on January 22, 1986. Her body was found in a park in Inglewood, California. The other two were killed in Los Angeles. Verna Williams, 36, was discovered in a stairwell on May 26, 1986. She was considered at the time to be a victim of the prolific, then-unidentified serial killer known as the Southside Slayer (later dubbed the Grim Sleeper, and later still identified as Lonnie David Franklin Jr.). Deborah Jackson, 32, was found on June 25, 1993.

Hughes was convicted in November 2011 and sentenced to death in June 2012 for the murders of Coleman, Williams, and McKinley. Hughes' motion to reduce his sentence to life without parole, based on upsetting events from his early life, namely that he was beaten as a child and had watched his mother give his sister an abortion, was denied.

Hughes is awaiting execution on death row at San Quentin State Prison.

Victims
Authorities suspect there may have been other victims. , detectives were investigating Hughes' possible involvement in other killings around the United States. While Hughes was in the Navy he spent time in Michigan, San Diego, Long Beach and  Frostburg, Maryland.

 1. Yvonne Coleman, 15. January 22, 1986.
 2. Verna Patricia Williams, 36. May 26, 1986.
 3. Deborah Jackson, 30, aka Harriet McKinley. December 1, 1987.
 4. Theresa Ballard, 26. September 23, 1992.
 5. Brenda Bradley, 38, October 5, 1992. A niece of former Los Angeles mayor Tom Bradley.
 6. Terri Myles, 33. November 8, 1993.
 7. Jamille Harrington, aka Jamie Harrington. November 14, 1993.

See also 
 Southside Slayer
 List of serial killers in the United States

References

External links 
California Department of Corrections and Rehabilitation - Inmate Locator CDCR number: P25039

1958 births
20th-century American criminals
American male criminals
American murderers of children
American people convicted of murder
American prisoners sentenced to life imprisonment
American rapists
American serial killers
Criminals from Los Angeles
Living people
Male serial killers
People convicted of murder by California
Prisoners sentenced to death by California
Prisoners sentenced to life imprisonment by California
Violence against women in the United States